Wijdemeren is a municipality in the Netherlands, in the province of North Holland, on the western border of the Gooi region.

Wijdemeren contains many lakes. In the north(east) Spiegelplas and Ankeveense Plassen, in the (south)west Loosdrechtse Plassen.

Wijdemeren was established as a merger of 's-Graveland, Loosdrecht, and Nederhorst den Berg on 1 January 2002. The former municipality of Loosdrecht belonged to the province of Utrecht.

Population centres 
The municipality of Wijdemeren consists of the following cities, towns, villages and/or districts:

Topography

Dutch Topographic map of the municipality of Wijdemeren, 2013.

Local government

Notable people 

 Jan Jacob Spöhler (1811–1866) 19th-century painter
 Hendrik Jan Schimmel (1823-1906) poet and novelist
 Barend Klaas Kuiper (1877-1961) a history professor and author, wrote about Dutch Calvinist church history
 Tjalling Koopmans (1910–1985) a Dutch American mathematician and economist, joint winner of the 1975 Nobel Memorial Prize in Economic Sciences
 Gustav Leonhardt (1928-2012) keyboard player, conductor, musicologist, teacher and editor
 Feike Sijbesma (born 1959) CEO of DSM
 Jeanine Hennis-Plasschaert (born 1973) politician and diplomat

Sport 
 Nelleke Penninx (born 1971) a retired rower, competed at the 1996 Summer Olympics and silver medallist at the 2000 Summer Olympics
 Jip Vastenburg (born 1994) long-distance athlete, competeted in the 2016 Summer Olympics

Gallery

Notes

External links 

 

 
Municipalities of North Holland
Municipalities of the Netherlands established in 2002